Flammeovirga arenaria is a bacterium from the genus of Flammeovirga which has been isolated from marine sand in Mexico.

References

External links
Type strain of Flammeovirga arenaria at BacDive -  the Bacterial Diversity Metadatabase	

Cytophagia
Bacteria described in 1969